"Ball and Chain" is a song by Southern California punk rock band Social Distortion. Written by Mike Ness in 1987, it is featured on their self-titled album released in 1990, as well as on Live at the Roxy (1998).

In the words of Ness, "Ball and Chain" is "a hard luck story," a forceful cry, a lament, a plea, a "folk prayer." 

The music video was directed by Tony van den Ende and edited by Scott C. Wilson.

References

1990 songs
Social Distortion songs
Epic Records singles
Songs written by Mike Ness
Songs about alcohol
Songs about drugs
Songs about prison